This article contains information about the literary events and publications of 1804.

Events
March 17 – The first performance of Friedrich Schiller's play Wilhelm Tell takes place at Weimar under the direction of Johann Wolfgang von Goethe.
April 15 – John Keats' father, a stable worker, dies of a fractured skull, after falling from his horse while returning from visiting John at school.
May – Samuel Taylor Coleridge travels to Attard in Malta, where he obtains employment as Acting Public Secretary.
unknown dates
James Mill's pamphlet critical of the corn trade, An Essay on the Impolicy of a Bounty on the Exportation of Grain, is published.
William Wordsworth writes his best-known poem "I Wandered Lonely as a Cloud", describing a scene he witnessed two years earlier.
German Gerhard Bonnier begins a publishing business in Copenhagen (Denmark) by issuing , origin of the Swedish Bonnier Group.

New books

Fiction
Mir Amman – Bagh o Buhar, a Translation into the Hindoostanee Tongue of the Celebrated Persian Tale "Qissui Chuhar Durwesh" "by Meer Ummun"
Sophie Ristaud Cottin – Malvina
Rachel Hunter -The Unexpected Legacy
William Henry Ireland – The Sepulchral Summons
Mary Meeke
Amazement
The Nine Days' Wonder
Amelia Opie – Adeline Mowbray
Ōta Nanpo (大田 南畝) and others –  (Collection of Shokusanjin memorabilia)
Anna Maria Porter – The Lake of Killarney

Children
François Guillaume Ducray-Duminil
Elmonde, ou la Fille de l'hospice (Edmonde, the charity girl)
Jules, ou le Toit paternel (Jules, or Under his father's roof)
Maria Edgeworth – Popular Tales
Eliza Fenwick – Mary and Her Cat
Ann Taylor and Jane Taylor – Original Poems for Infant Minds by several young persons, Vol. 1

Drama
Richard Cumberland – The Sailor's Daughter
 Francis Ludlow Holt – The Land We Live In
Friedrich von Schiller – Wilhelm Tell
Friedrich Hölderlin – translations of the dramas of Sophocles (published)

Poetry
William Blake – Jerusalem: The Emanation of the Giant Albion
William Lisle Bowles – The Spirit of Discovery
Kirsha Danilov – The Ancient Russian Poems

Non-fiction
Thomas Brown – Inquiry into the Relation of Cause and Effect
John Wilson Croker – Familiar Epistles to J. F. Jones, Esquire, on the State of the Irish Stage
Jakob Friedrich Fries – System der Philosophie als evidente Wissenschaft
Jacques Labillardière – Novae Hollandiae Plantarum Specimen
James Maitland, 8th Earl of Lauderdale – Inquiry into the Nature and Origin of Public Wealth

Births
July 1 – George Sand (Lucile Aurore Dupin), French novelist and memoirist (died 1876)
July 4 – Nathaniel Hawthorne, American novelist (died 1864)
September 8 – Eduard Mörike, German poet (died 1875)
November 6 – Benjamin Hall Kennedy, English classicist (died 1880)
December 10 – Eugène Sue, French novelist (died 1857)
December 21 – Benjamin Disraeli, English novelist and prime minister (died 1881)

Deaths
January 4 – Charlotte Lennox, English novelist and playwright (born c. 1730)
January 11 – James Tytler, Scottish American editor of Encyclopædia Britannica (born 1745)
February 6 – Joseph Priestley, English natural philosopher and theologian (born 1733)
February 12 – Immanuel Kant, German philosopher (born 1724)
February 19 – Philip Yorke, Welsh antiquary and genealogist (born 1743)
April 3 – Jędrzej Kitowicz, Polish historian and diarist (born c. 1727)
April 27 – Jonathan Boucher, English philologist (born 1738)
May 3 – Celestyn Czaplic, Polish poet and politician (born 1723)
July 16 – Jean-Louis de Lolme, Swiss political theorist (born 1741)
August 9 – Robert Potter, English translator, poet and cleric (born 1721)
August 13 – Anica Bošković, Ragusan writer (born 1714)
October 30 – Samuel Ayscough, English librarian and indexer (born 1745)
November 5 – Betje Wolff, Dutch novelist (born 1738)
November 23 – Richard Graves, English poet and novelist (born 1715)
December 9 – Wilhelm Abraham Teller, German theologian (born 1734)
December – John Boydell, English Shakespeare illustrator and engraver (born 1720)

References

 
Years of the 19th century in literature